Commission of inquiry may refer to:
 Public inquiry, a review of events ordered by a government body.
 Royal commission, a formal public inquiry into a defined issue in some monarchies.
 United Nations commission of inquiry, a United Nations mission carried out with the intention to discover facts.